The Patriots (LP) is a nationalist and hard Eurosceptic political party in France. Founded by former vice president of the Front National (FN) Florian Philippot, it was registered on 29 September 2017. The party strongly supports a French withdrawal from both the European Union (EU) and Eurozone.

Gallery

Election results

European Parliament

See also 
List of political parties in France
Politics of France

References

External links 
Official Les Patriotes website

2017 establishments in France
Far-right politics in France
Gaullist parties
Political parties established in 2017
Right-wing parties in France
Right-wing populism in France
Right-wing populist parties